Baek Jong-hwan (born 18 April 1985) is a South Korean footballer who plays for Daejeon Citizen in the K League Challenge.

Career
Baek began his playing career with Jeju United in 2008. In July 2010, he moved to Gangwon FC.

Statistics

References

External links

1985 births
Living people
South Korean footballers
Jeju United FC players
Gangwon FC players
Gimcheon Sangmu FC players
Daejeon Hana Citizen FC players
K League 2 players
K League 1 players
Association football defenders